Ruler 3 is the designated title for the third ruler of Copan after the reformation by K'inich Yax K'uk' Mo'.

Notes

5th-century monarchs in North America
Rulers of Copán
465 deaths
Year of birth missing
5th century in the Maya civilization
Unidentified people